The Papyrus Carlsberg Collection is a collection of Egyptian Papyri, which was founded in the early 1930s by Prof H. O. Lange with the help funds of the Carlsberg Foundation. The majority of the documents were purchased between 1931 and 1938. Later on, in 1939, the foundation, with the consent of the Ministry of Education and the headmaster, presented its collection in the University of Copenhagen.

History 
After being founded in the 1930s, the collection was expanded with a series of purchases from 1931 to 1938. Afterwards, the collection was situated in the Egyptological department as a part of the Carsten Niebuhr Department of the Institute of Cross-Cuiltural and Regional Studies in Denmark.

In 1954, Aksel Volten, who was the keeper of the collection at the time since 1943, substantially grew the collection by acquiring other documents, which was all funded by the Carlsberg Foundation.

In 2003, the demotic and hieratic papyri were transferred in the papyrus collection of the Greek and Latin department of the university. And the Papyrus Haunienses Collection was transferred to the Papyrus Carlsberg Collection.

Contents 
The Carlsberg Papyrus Collection includes more than 500 papyri and a very large amount of uncatalogued material. The main source of the papyri are the purchased documents by the Carlsberg Foundation and the secondary large source are the papyri that came in possession of Prof. H. O. Lange. The majority of the writings consist of demotic and hieratic texts, most of Roman date belonging to the Tebtynis Temple library. The main topics found in the papyri so far are regarding astronomy, astrology, mathematics, cosmology,  a herbal, a legal manual, a few onomastica, world lists and grammatical texts, dream interpretation, and others.

Other interesting contents are the Teaching of King Merikare, which was purchased from Ludwig Borchardt for the collection, two Coptic codices, brought in after being purchased from Carl Schmidt and a few papyri which came from the possession of Prof. Sander-Hansen. The majority of the documents are yet to be translated but leading Egyptologists believe that doing so would greatly expand the current knowledge in terms of ancient medicine, astronomy, botany, astrology and other scientific fields, practiced in Ancient Egypt.

References 

Carlsberg Group
Papyrus